JR Ewing was a hardcore punk/screamo band from Norway. It was formed in 1998 in Oslo and broke up after its final tour across Europe in 2006.

Discography 
Full albums:
 2000 – Calling in Dead
 2003 – Ride Paranoia
 2005 – Maelstrom

EPs, singles:
 2000 – The Singles Collected
 2002 – The Perfect Drama
 2003 – Laughing With Daggers
 2005 – Fucking & Champagne

Band members

Final line up 
 Andreas Tylden – vocals
 Erlend Mokkelbost – guitar, background vocals
 Håkon Mella – guitar
 Kenneth Lamond – drums
 Petter Snekkestad – bass guitar, background vocals

Former members 
 Aaron Rudra – original bass guitarist
 Nils Strand – bass guitar
 Jonas Thire – drums
 Morten Billeskalns – drums
 Martin Faksvaag Molden – guitar

External links 
 JR Ewing interview
 "JR Ewing - Change Is Nothing (Everything Is)" (official video)
 "JR Ewing - Fucking & Champaigne" (official video)

Norwegian musical groups
Screamo musical groups